Bobby Braumiller was a German bobsledder who competed in the late 1930s. He won a silver medal in the four-man event at the 1938 FIBT World Championships at Garmisch-Partenkirchen.

References
Bobsleigh four-man world championship medalists since 1930

German male bobsledders
Possibly living people
Year of birth missing